The Reformed Church of Aargau or Reformierte Landeskirche des Kantons Aargau is a Reformed state cantonal church in Aargau, Switzerland. It was founded in 1803, and according to the 2004 statistics the Aargau Reformed Church had 76 Presbyteries and 1 Synod with almost 200,000 members and 76 parishes and 107 ordained clergy. The official language is German. Member of the Schweizerischer Evangelischer Kirchenbund. Women ordination is allowed. Blessing of same-sex unions were allowed and on September 18, 2019 blessing of same-sex marriages were allowed.

List of churches

External links 
Reformed Landeskirche Aargau

References 

Aargau
Aargau
Aargau